Akkoyunlu is a village in the Çobanlar District, Afyonkarahisar Province, Turkey. Its population is 362 (2021).

The current languages spoken are Turkish, Kurdish, Azerbaijani, and Avaric.

References

Villages in Çobanlar District